Balloon Man may refer to:

 The Balloonman, an episode of the television series Gotham
 Balloon Man (album), a 1989 album by Iain Ballamy
 Balloon Man, a character from the animated film Teen Titans Go! To the Movies